is a railway station located in Kagoshima, Kagoshima, Japan.
The station opened in 1944.

Lines 
Kyushu Railway Company
Ibusuki Makurazaki Line

JR

Adjacent stations

Nearby places
Shigakukan Junior High School & High School
Shigakukan University
Minami Junior High School
Kagoshima Women's Junior College

Railway stations in Kagoshima Prefecture
Railway stations in Japan opened in 1930